MPTP (1-methyl-4-phenyl-1,2,3,6-tetrahydropyridine) is a chemical precursor to the neurotoxin MPP+, which causes permanent symptoms of Parkinson's disease by destroying dopaminergic neurons in the substantia nigra of the brain. It has been used to study disease models in various animal studies.

While MPTP itself has no psychoactive effects, the compound may be accidentally produced during the manufacture of MPPP, a synthetic opioid drug with effects similar to those of morphine and pethidine (meperidine). The Parkinson-inducing effects of MPTP were first discovered following accidental injection as a result of contaminated MPPP.

Toxicity

Injection of MPTP causes rapid onset of Parkinsonism, hence users of MPPP contaminated with MPTP will develop these symptoms.

MPTP itself is not toxic, and as a lipophilic compound can cross the blood–brain barrier. Once inside the brain, MPTP is metabolized into the toxic cation 1-methyl-4-phenylpyridinium (MPP+) by the enzyme monoamine oxidase B (MAO-B) of glial cells, specifically astrocytes. MPP+ kills primarily dopamine-producing neurons in a part of the brain called the pars compacta of the substantia nigra. MPP+ interferes with complex I of the electron transport chain, a component of mitochondrial metabolism, which leads to cell death and causes the buildup of free radicals, toxic molecules that contribute further to cell destruction.

Because MPTP itself is not directly harmful, toxic effects of acute MPTP poisoning can be mitigated by the administration of monoamine oxidase inhibitors (MAOIs) such as selegiline. MAOIs prevent the metabolism of MPTP to MPP+ by inhibiting the action of MAO-B, minimizing toxicity, and preventing neural death.

Dopaminergic neurons are selectively vulnerable to MPP+ because DA neurons exhibit dopamine reuptake which is mediated by DAT, which also has high-affinity for MPP+. The dopamine transporter scavenges for excessive dopamine at the synaptic spaces and transports them back into the cell. Even though this property is exhibited by both VTA and SNc neurons, VTA neurons are protective against MPP+ insult due to the expression of calbindin. Calbindin regulates the availability of Ca2+ within the cell, which is not the case in SNc neurons due to their high-calcium-dependent autonomous pacemaker activity.

The gross depletion of dopaminergic neurons severely affects cortical control of complex movements. The direction of complex movement is based from the substantia nigra to the putamen and caudate nucleus, which then relay signals to the rest of the brain. This pathway is controlled via dopamine-using neurons, which MPTP selectively destroys, resulting, over time, in parkinsonism.

MPTP causes Parkinsonism in primates, including humans. Rodents are much less susceptible. Rats are almost immune to the adverse effects of MPTP. Mice were thought to only suffer from cell death in the substantia nigra (to a differing degree according to the strain of mice used) but do not show Parkinsonian symptoms; however, most of the recent studies indicate that MPTP can result in Parkinsonism-like syndromes in mice (especially chronic syndromes). It is believed that the lower levels of MAO-B in the rodent brain's capillaries may be responsible for this.

Discovery in users of illicit drugs
The neurotoxicity of MPTP was hinted at in 1976 after Barry Kidston, a 23-year-old chemistry graduate student in Maryland, US, synthesized MPPP with MPTP as a major impurity and self-injected the result. Within three days he began exhibiting symptoms of Parkinson's disease. The National Institute of Mental Health found traces of MPTP and other pethidine analogs in his lab. They tested the substances on rats, but due to rodents' tolerance for this type of neurotoxin, nothing was observed. Kidston's Parkinsonism was treated with levodopa but he died 18 months later from a cocaine overdose. Upon autopsy, Lewy bodies and destruction of dopaminergic neurons in the substantia nigra were discovered.

In 1983, four people in Santa Clara County, California, US, were diagnosed with Parkinsonism after having used MPPP contaminated with MPTP. The neurologist J. William Langston in collaboration with NIH tracked down MPTP as the cause, and its effects on primates were researched. After performing neural grafts of fetal tissue on three of the patients at Lund University Hospital in Sweden, the motor symptoms of two of the three patients were successfully treated, and the third showed partial recovery.

Langston documented the case in his 1995 book The Case of the Frozen Addicts, which was later featured in two NOVA productions by PBS, re-aired in the UK on the BBC science series Horizon.

Contribution of MPTP to research into Parkinson's disease 
Langston et al.(1984) found that injections of MPTP in squirrel monkeys resulted in Parkinsonism, symptoms of which were subsequently reduced by levodopa, the drug-of-choice in the treatment of Parkinson's disease along with carbidopa and entacapone. The symptoms and brain structures of MPTP-induced Parkinson's disease are fairly indistinguishable to the point that MPTP may be used to simulate the disease in order to study Parkinson's disease physiology and possible treatments within the laboratory. Mouse studies have shown that susceptibility to MPTP increases with age.

Knowledge of MPTP and its use in reliably recreating Parkinson's disease symptoms in experimental models has inspired scientists to investigate the possibilities of surgically replacing neuron loss through fetal tissue implants, subthalamic electrical stimulation and stem cell research, all of which have demonstrated initial provisional successes.

It has been postulated that Parkinson's disease may be caused by minute amounts of MPP+-like compounds from ingestion or exogenously through repeated exposure and that these substances are too minute to be detected significantly by epidemiological studies.

In 2000, another animal model for Parkinson's disease was found. It was shown that the pesticide and insecticide rotenone causes Parkinsonism in rats by killing dopaminergic neurons in the substantia nigra. Like MPP+, rotenone also interferes with complex I of the electron transport chain.

Synthesis and uses
MPTP was first synthesized as a potential analgesic in 1947 by Ziering et al. by reaction of phenylmagnesium bromide with 1-methyl-4-piperidinone. It was tested as a treatment for various conditions, but the tests were halted when Parkinson-like symptoms were noticed in monkeys. In one test of the substance, two of six human subjects died.

MPTP is used in industry as a chemical intermediate; the chloride of the toxic metabolite MPP+, cyperquat, has been used as a herbicide. While cyperquat is not used anymore, the closely related substance paraquat is still being used as a herbicide in some countries.

In popular culture
	
 In the novel Neuromancer, authored by William Gibson, MPTP is used as a means of inducing Parkinsonism in another character. 
	
 MPTP-induced Parkinson's disease is featured in the Law & Order episode "Stiff."

 In Roger Williams' novel The Metamorphosis of Prime Intellect the protagonist administers MPTP to the anti-heroine’s former nurse, who had stolen her painkillers in life, doing so as a means of neurodegenerative torture.

See also 

 Phenindamine
 6-Hydroxydopamine
 Norsalsolinol

References

External links

Erowid MPTP Vault - Contains information regarding MPTP as a neurotoxin
PBS NOVA episode, "The Case of the Frozen Addict"https://openvault.wgbh.org/catalog/V_474CF2C8A20B4173988486AC4C605A3C
"The MPTP Story" by J. William Langston. nih.gov.

Neurotoxins
Prodrugs
Tetrahydropyridines
Phenyl compounds